KKJ may refer to:
 Kamikaze Kaitō Jannu or Phantom Thief Jeanne, a magical girl shōjo manga series
 Kitakyushu Airport, the IATA code KKJ
 Kokura Airport, the former IATA code KKJ
 Bantu language, the ISO 639-3 code KKJ